The year 2020 in Japanese music.

Debuting

Debuting groups

All at Once
Arcana Project
Beatcats
BIN
Chō Tokimeki Sendenbu
EXIT
Go to the Beds
JO1
Morfonica
Nature
NCT Dream
Nemophila
NiziU
Orbit
Paradises
Piggs
Sakurazaka46
SixTones
Snow Man
Stray Kids
Tomorrow X Together
Zamb

Debuting soloists

Ado
Ai Furihata
Fujii Kaze
Hikaru
Yurina Hirate
Hoshimachi Suisei
Gakuto Kajiwara
Ryota Katayose
Keiko
Takuya Kimura
Haruka Kudō
Akane Kumada
Tomori Kusunoki
Liyuu
Karin Miyamoto
Nana Mori
Win Morisaki
Yuki Nakashima
Yui Ninomiya
Koutaro Nishiyama
Sae Ōtsuka
Miki Satō
Riho Sayashi
Nanaka Suwa
Aina Suzuki
Azumi Waki
Reina Washio
Jun. K

Returning from hiatus

 12012
 Does
 Chris Hart
 Hirakawachi Itchōme
 Iz*One
 Lindberg
 Pour Lui
 Marble
 Nightmare
 Seikima-II
 Tokyo Jihen
 Under17

Events
71st NHK Kōhaku Uta Gassen

Number-ones
Oricon number-one albums
Oricon number-one singles
Hot 100 number-one singles

Awards
62nd Japan Record Awards
2020 MTV Video Music Awards Japan

Albums released

January

February

March

April

May

June

July

August

September

October

November

December

Disbanding and retiring artists

Disbanding

Carry Loose
E-girls
Fairies
Group Tamashii
Gugudan
Hachimitsu Rocket
Magnolia Factory
Party Rockets GT
PrizmaX
Sora tob sakana
SudannaYuzuYully
Tegomass
Uijin

Retiring
Chisato Okai
Manami Numakura
Mayu Watanabe

Going on hiatus

AAA
Arashi
Baroque
College Cosmos
Good Morning America
Masahiko Kondō
Ladybaby
Mrs. Green Apple
Marius Yo

See also
 2020 in Japan
 2020 in Japanese television
 List of Japanese films of 2020

References